Bar Ahui may refer to:
 Bar Ahui, Hirmand
 Bar Ahui, Zabol